Trick(s) may refer to:

People
 Trick McSorley (1852–1936), American professional baseball player
 Armon Trick (born 1978), retired German international rugby union player
 David Trick (born 1955), former Ontario civil servant and university administrator
 Marcus Trick (born 1977), retired German international rugby union player
 Stanley Arthur Trick (1884–1958), English cricketer for Essex
 Stephanie Trick (born 1987), American stride, ragtime and jazz pianist
 Trick Daddy (born 1973), American rapper and producer
 Trick-Trick (born 1973), Detroit rapper

Arts, entertainment, and media

Films

 Trick (1999 film), American film
 Trick (2019 film), American Halloween-themed horror film
 Tricks (1925 film), American silent film
 Tricks (1997 film), TV movie; see Jay Friedkin
 Tricks (2007 film), Polish film by Andrzej Jakimowski
 The Trick (2021 film), BBC film about the Climatic Research Unit email controversy

Literature
 Trick (novel), a 2015 novel by Natalia Jaster
 Tricks, a 1979 chronicle of homosexual encounters by Renaud Camus
 Tricks (novel), a 2009 novel by Ellen Hopkins

Music
 Trick-Trick (born 1973), Detroit rapper
 Stephanie Trick (born 1987), American stride, ragtime and jazz pianist
 Trick Daddy (born 1973), American rapper and producer

Albums
 Trick (Kumi Koda album), 2009
 Trick (Panic Channel album), 2005
 Trick (Kele Okereke album), 2014
 Trick (Jamie T album), 2016
 Tricks (ohGr album), 2018
 Trick (Alex G album), 2012

Songs
 "Trick", by Girls' Generation from The Boys, 2011
 "Trick", by IMx from Introducing IMx, 1999
 "Trick", by Saweetie from Icy, 2019
 "Trick (So Sweet)", by Seaway from Colour Blind, 2015
 "Tricks", by Falco from Wiener Blut, 1988
 "Tricks", by MC Breed from It's All Good, 1999
 "Tricks", by Tony Bennett from This Is All I Ask, 1963
 "The Trick", by AJR from OK Orchestra, 2021

Other uses in arts, entertainment, and media
 Magic trick, an illusion or act of misdirection
 Trick (TV series), a comedic Japanese television drama
 Trick McCorrigan, a fictional character in the Canadian television series Lost Girl
 Stop trick, a simple film special effect

Sports and games
 Trick, skill, or element, a maneuver in various sports:
 Trick, an acrobatic move performed in an acro dance
 Juggling trick, a maneuver performed while juggling
 Skateboarding trick, a maneuver performed on a skateboard
 Trick shot, a shot played on a billiards table, which seems unlikely or impossible, or requires significant skill
 Tricking, a martial arts-based sport with emphasis on aesthetics
 Hat-trick, in sports, succeeding at anything three times in three consecutive attempts, or three times in one game
 Trick-taking game, a type of card game

Other uses
 Trick (nautical term)
 Trick, or john, a person who pays for prostitution (in slang "Turn a trick"), process referred to as "Trickin"
 Sex trick, another term for a unique sexual position
 Trick, a neat or unexpected solution in computer programming
 Confidence trick, a trick performed by a con artist

See also
 Hat trick (disambiguation)
 Trichomoniasis or trich, a sexually transmitted infection
 Trick-or-treating, an activity for children on Halloween
 Tricked (disambiguation)
 Tricky (disambiguation)
 Trix (disambiguation)
Surnames of German origin
German-language surnames